Tulak (also Romanized as Tūlak) is a village in Gowavar Rural District, Govar District, Gilan-e Gharb County, Kermanshah Province, Iran. At the 2006 census, its population was 154, in 33 families.

References 

Populated places in Gilan-e Gharb County